Thirumoorthy Dam is a masonry gravity dam located at Thirumoorthy hills in Udumalaipettai, Tamil Nadu.

References

Dams in Tamil Nadu
Year of establishment missing
Tiruppur district